This article contains a sortable table listing mountains of Italy. All mountain heights and prominences on the list are from the largest-scale maps available. In the list, only the exact location of the culminating point of the mountain is considered.

List

Alps

Apennines

Sicily

Sardinia

Other Mountains

See also 

List of volcanoes in Italy
List of mountains of the Alps
List of Alpine peaks by prominence
List of Alpine four-thousanders
List of Italian regions by highest point

Notes

References

Sources
Jonathan de Ferranti & Eberhard Jurgalski's map-checked ALPS TO R589m and rough, computer-generated EUROPE TO R150m lists 
Mark Trengrove's lists of several regions of the French Alps, and of the Grand paradiso and Rutor ranges of the Italian Alps

 
Italy
Mountains
Italy